Taxi Driver is the third studio album by Italian recording artist Rkomi, released by Island Records on 30 April 2021.
The album was titled after Martin Scorsese's 1976 film, which is also cited in its artwork, showing Rkomi leaning on a yellow cab. It includes guest appearances of Tommaso Paradiso, Gazzelle, The Night Skinny, Ariete, Tommi Dali, Irama, Shablo, Sfera Ebbasta, Junior K, Roshelle, Dario Faini, Ernia, Mace, Chiello, and Gaia.

Taxi Driver continued Rkomi's departure from rap to pop music, also showing rock influences. Its tracks are built with a cantautore approach, and create a heterogeneous mix of influences.

Taxi Driver was a commercial success, debuting at number one on the Italian Albums Chart and landing three top ten singles in its first week, including the chart topper "Nuovo range". It went on to receive a triple platinum certification by FIMI, and it became the best-selling album of 2021 in Italy.

Track listing

Charts

Weekly charts

Year-end charts

Certifications

Year-end list

References

2021 albums
Italian-language albums
Island Records albums